Maurice Edward Coxhead (24 May 1889 – 3 May 1917) was an English first-class cricketer active who played for Middlesex. He was born in Kensington and educated at Eastbourne College and Brasenose College, Oxford. He was killed near Monchy, France, on active service in the Royal Fusiliers during World War I.

References

1889 births
1917 deaths
English cricketers
Middlesex cricketers
Oxford University cricketers
People educated at Eastbourne College
Alumni of Brasenose College, Oxford
Royal Fusiliers officers
British military personnel killed in World War I
Gentlemen of England cricketers
British Army personnel of World War I